USS Lady Doris (SP-3854) was a proposed patrol vessel the United States Navy acquired in 1918 but never commissioned.

Lady Doris was built in 1916 as a private motorboat of the same name by the Reliance Boat Company at New Orleans, Louisiana. On 10 June 1918, the U.S. Navy chartered her from her owner, H. D. Newman of New Orleans, for use as a section patrol boat during World War I. She was assigned the section patrol number SP-3854.

Although assigned to the 8th Naval District, Lady Doris saw no active naval service. The Navy returned her to Newman on 2 October 1918.

References

SP-3854: Lady Doris at Department of the Navy Naval History and Heritage Command Online Library of Selected Images: U.S. Navy Ships -- Listed by Hull Number "SP" #s and "ID" #s -- World War I Era Patrol Vessels and other Acquired Ships and Craft numbered from ID # 3800 through ID # 3899
NavSource Online: Section Patrol Craft Photo Archive Lady Doris (SP 3854) 

Patrol vessels of the United States Navy
World War I patrol vessels of the United States
Ships built in New Orleans
1916 ships